State Route 126 (SR 126) is a state highway in central Maine connecting Lewiston and Washington.

Route description 
SR 126 begins at an intersection with U.S. Route 202 (US 202) and SR 100 in Lewiston. In Sabattus, it begins a long concurrency with SR 9, which continues until it reaches Gardiner. Along the way, it intersects with Interstate 295 (I-295) just outside Gardiner. From Gardiner, it travels eastward towards Washington.

History 
SR 126 was originally designated in 1925 and ran between Lewiston and Richmond Corner. In 1929, the road was extended to Jefferson. Shortly thereafter, it was extended to its current terminus near Washington.

Junction list

References

126
Transportation in Androscoggin County, Maine
Transportation in Kennebec County, Maine
Transportation in Knox County, Maine
Transportation in Lincoln County, Maine
Lewiston, Maine
Gardiner, Maine